Raheny United Football Club is an Irish association football club based in Raheny, Dublin. Raheny United was founded in 1994 following the amalgamation of Raheny Boys and Dunseedy United. In 2017–18 their senior men's team compete in the Premier A division of the Athletic Union League. An over–35s team compete in the Amateur Football League. They also have 35 schoolboy teams competing in both the Dublin & District Schoolboy League and the North Dublin Schoolboys/Girls League.

The club's senior women's team became founder members of the Women's National League in 2011–12. They were league champions in both 2012–13 and 2013–14 and also competed in both the 2013–14 and the 2014–15 UEFA Women's Champions League. In 2015 Raheny United's senior women's team merged with Shelbourne Ladies F.C. This effectively saw Shelbourne take Raheny United's place in the WNL. The club currently cater for four senior teams, thirty schoolboy teams, and host their own youth academy every Saturday morning, making them one of the larger junior soccer clubs in Ireland.

History

Women's team
In August 2011 the Football Association of Ireland announced that Raheny United would be one of seven founding members of the Women's National League. In their debut season, 2011–12 they finished as runners-up to Peamount United. The following two seasons, 2012–13 and 2013–14, saw them finish as league champions. They also won the FAI Women's Cup in 2012, 2013 and 2014
. In the 2013–14 UEFA Women's Champions League they finished third in their qualifying group.  In the 2014–15 UEFA Women's Champions League they became the first Irish team to qualify from the group stage with a 100% record, having beaten CFF Olimpia Cluj, FC NSA Sofia and Hibernians F.C. In the round of 32 they lost to Bristol Academy.

Raheny United in Europe

2013–14 UEFA Women's Champions League

Group 3

2014–15 UEFA Women's Champions League

Group 2

Rround of 32

First Leg

Second Leg

Bristol Academy won 6–1 on aggregate.

Location

Raheny United's clubhouse is located on All Saints Drive beside both the local Garda station and Raheny GAA club. It is also near Raheny railway station. 
 The club plays the majority of their home games at the nearby St. Anne's Park.

Notable former players

Republic of Ireland women's internationals

  Diane Caldwell
  Megan Campbell
  Ciara Grant
  Siobhán Killeen
  Katie McCabe
  Noelle Murray
  Olivia O'Toole
  Niamh Reid Burke
  Sarah Rowe
  Stephanie Roche
  Clare Shine
  Caroline Thorpe
  Mary Waldron

  Ciaran Bernard

Honours

Women's team
 Women's National League
Winners: 2012–13, 2013–14 : 2
Runners-up: 2011–12: 1
FAI Women's Cup
Winners: 2012, 2013, 2014: 3
Runners-up: 2007: 1
WNL Cup
Winners: 2015: 1

References

 
Athletic Union League (Dublin) clubs
Women's association football clubs in the Republic of Ireland
Association football clubs in Dublin (city)
Association football clubs established in 1994
1994 establishments in Ireland
Former Women's National League (Ireland) teams
Dublin Women's Soccer League teams